The Niagara Falls Rapids were a Class-A minor league baseball team located in Niagara Falls, New York. The team played in the New York–Penn League throughout its existence. The team played all of their home games at Sal Maglie Stadium.

The team began in 1970  as the Niagara Falls Pirates, and were affiliated with the Pittsburgh Pirates until 1977. In 1982, the team became affiliated with the Chicago White Sox and took up the new name the Niagara Falls Sox. The affiliation with the White Sox would last until 1985. Then after a four-year hiatus the team was reestablished  and affiliated with the Detroit Tigers under the Rapids name.  However, in 1993 the team relocated to Jamestown, New York, and became the Jamestown Jammers.

Notable alumni

 Dale Berra (1975)

 John Cangelosi (1982)

 Tony Clark (1992) MLB All-Star

 Terry Collins (1971)

 Chuck Cottier (1971-1972)

 Miguel Dilone (1972)

 Doug Drabek (1983) MLB All-Star; 1990 NL Cy Young Award

 Steve Farr (1977)

 Bobby Higginson (1992)

 Al Holland (1975) MLB All-Star

 Rick Honeycutt (1976) 2 x MLB All-Star; 1983 AL ERA Title

 Odell Jones (1972)

 Brian Moehler (1993)

 Omar Moreno (1970, 1972) 2 x NL Stolen Base Leader

 Ed Ott (1970)

 Larry Parrish (1992-1993) 2 x MLB All-Star

 Aurelio Rodriguez (1990)

 Luis Salazar (1976)

 Rod Scurry (1974)

 Bobby Thigpen (1985) MLB All-Star

 Randy Velarde (1985)

Categories
:Category:Niagara Falls Pirates players
:Category:Niagara Falls Rapids players
:Category:Niagara Falls Sox players

References

External links
Baseball-Reference (Minors)

Defunct New York–Penn League teams
Defunct baseball teams in New York (state)
Niagara Falls, New York
Chicago White Sox minor league affiliates
Detroit Tigers minor league affiliates
Pittsburgh Pirates minor league affiliates
Baseball teams established in 1970
Baseball teams disestablished in 1993
1970 establishments in New York (state)
1993 disestablishments in New York (state)